Qahremanluy may refer to:
 Qahremanluy-e Olya
 Qahremanluy-e Sofla